"Remedy" (stylized in all caps) is a song by Swedish DJ and record producer Alesso. It features vocals from English singer Conor Maynard. It was released on 31 August 2018.

Charts

Weekly charts

Year-end charts

Certifications

References

2018 singles
2018 songs
Alesso songs
Conor Maynard songs
Songs written by Alesso
Songs written by Andrew Haas
Songs written by Ian Franzino
Song recordings produced by Alesso